Table tennis at the 1988 Summer Paralympics consisted of 37 events, 27 for men and 10 for women.

Medal table

Medal summary

Men's events

Women's events

References 

 

1988 Summer Paralympics events
1988
Paralympics